Johann Ulrich Mayr (1629 in Augsburg – 1704 in Augsburg), was a German Baroque painter.

According to Joachim von Sandrart he was the son of the painter Susanna Mayr, whose father Johann Georg Fischer was also a painter.
According to the RKD he was a pupil of Rembrandt in Amsterdam and was also a pupil of Jacob Jordaens in Antwerp. He also travelled to England and Rome and is known for etchings and genre works.

References

Johann Ulrich Mayr on Artnet

1629 births
1704 deaths
German Baroque painters
Artists from Augsburg
Pupils of Rembrandt